This article is about the sound system of the Navajo language. The phonology of Navajo is intimately connected to its morphology. For example, the entire range of contrastive consonants is found only at the beginning of word stems. In stem-final position and in prefixes, the number of contrasts is drastically reduced. Similarly, vowel contrasts (including their prosodic combinatory possibilities) found outside of the stem are significantly neutralized. For details about the morphology of Navajo, see Navajo grammar.

Like most Athabascan languages, Navajo is coronal heavy, having many phonological contrasts at coronal places of articulation and less at other places. Also typical of the family, Navajo has a limited number of labial sounds, both in terms of its phonemic inventory and in their occurrence in actual lexical items and displays of consonant harmony.

Consonants
The consonant phonemes of Navajo are listed below.

Phonetics
All consonants are long, compared to English: with plain stops the hold is longer, with aspirated stops the aspiration is longer, and with affricates the frication is longer. The voice onset time of the aspirated and ejective stops is twice as long as that found in most non-Athabaskan languages.  described Navajo consonants as "doubled" between vowels, but in fact they are equally long in all positions.

Stops and affricates
All stops and affricates, except for the bilabial and glottal, have a three-way laryngeal contrast between unaspirated, aspirated, and ejective. The labials  are found in only a few words. Most of the contrasts in the inventory lie within coronal territory at the alveolar and palatoalveolar places of articulation.

The velar aspiration is also found on a labialized velar  (orthographic ). There is variation within Navajo, however, in this respect: some dialects lack strong velar frication having instead a period of aspiration.

Similarly the unaspirated velar  (orthographic ) is realized as with optional voiced velar frication following the stop burst: . However, the aspirated and ejective laterals are true affricates.

The ejectives , on the other hand, have short frication, presumably due to the lack of pulmonic airflow. There is a period of near silence before the glottalized onset of the vowel. In  there may be a double glottal release, or a creaky onset to the vowel not found in the other ejective affricates.

Continuants
Navajo voiceless continuants are realized as fricatives. They are typically noisier than the fricatives that occur in English. The palato-alveolars  are not labialized unlike English and other European languages.

Navajo also does not have consistent phonetic voicing in the "voiced" continuant members. Although  are described as voiced in impressionist descriptions, data from spectrograms shows that they may be partially devoiced during the constriction. In stem-initial position,  tends to be fully voiced,  has a slight tendency to be voiceless near the offset,  is often mostly voiceless with phonetic voicing only at the onset,  is also only partially voiced with voicing at onset. A more consistent acoustic correlate of the "voicing" is the duration of the consonant: "voiceless" consonants have longer durations than "voiced" consonants. Based on this,  argues that the distinction is better captured with the notion of a fortis/lenis contrast. A further characteristic of voicing in Navajo is that it is marginally contrastive (see the voicing assimilation section).

Navajo lacks a clear distinction between phonetic fricatives and approximants. Although the pair ~ has been described as a fricative and an approximant, respectively, the lack of a consistent contrast between the two phonetic categories and a similar patterning with other fricative pairs suggests that they are better described as continuants.

Sonorants
A more abstract analysis of Navajo posits two different  phonemes (see the below for elaboration).

The glottalized sonorants are the result of d-effect on the non-glottalized counterparts.

Glottal(ized) consonants
Consonants involving a glottal closure – the glottal stop, ejective stops, and the glottalized sonorants – may have optional creaky voice on voiced sounds adjacent to the glottal gesture. Glottal stops may also be realized entirely as creaky voice instead of single glottal closure. Ejectives in Navajo differ from the ejectives in many other languages in that the glottal closure is not released near-simultaneously with the release of the oral closure (as is common in other languages) – it is held for a significant amount of time following oral release. The glottalized sonorants  are articulated with a glottal stop preceding the oral closure with optional creaky voice during the oral closure: .

Labialized consonants
Consonants  are predictable variants that occur before the rounded oral vowel . However, these sounds also occur before the vowels  where they contrast with their non-labialized counterparts .

Velar , palatal 

The phonological contrast between the velar obstruent  and the palatal glide  is neutralized in certain contexts. However, in these contexts, they may often be distinguished from each other by their different phonological patterning.

The realization before  varies between an approximant  and a weakly fricated approximant . The following verb stem has different velar allophones of the stem-initial consonant:

{| class="wikitable"
! Word !! Underlying !! Phonetic !! ! Gloss
|-
|   ||  ||  || 'make bubbling noise' (iterative, continuative)
|-
|  ||  ||  || 'make bubbling noise' (iterative, repetitive)
|}

The palatal glide  is also phonetically between an approximant  and a fricative .  compares it to English  with a "slight but audible 'rubbiness' or frication."

The contrast between velar  and palatal  is found before both back vowels  as the following contrasts demonstrate:

{| class="wikitable"
! !! Word !! Underlying !! Phonetic !! Gloss
|-
! rowspan="2" | contrast before 
|  ||  ||  || 'its fur'
|-
|  ||  ||  || 'its lice'
|-
| style="background-color: lightGrey;" colspan="5" |
|-
! rowspan="2" | contrast before 
|  ||  ||  || 'its marrow'
|-
|  ||  ||  || 'its breath'
|}

However, the underlying consonant can be ascertained in verb stems and noun stems via their different realizations in a voiceless (i.e. fortis) context. The underlying velar surfaces as a voiceless palatal fricative  in these environments:

{| class="wikitable" style="text-align: right;"
! colspan="3" | Fortis context
! colspan="3" | Lenis context
|- style="font-size: x-small;"
! Word !! Phonetic !! Gloss !! Word !! Phonetic !! Gloss
|-
|  ||  || 'bundle'
|  ||  || 'her bundle'
|-
| style="background-color: lightGrey;" colspan="7" |
|-
|  ||  || 'I pick (corn)'
|  ||  || 'she picks (corn)'
|}

When intervocalic, it is realized as lenis  (as ). Likewise, the underlying velar of the verb stem  is a voiceless  after the preceding voiceless  and lenis  when intervocalic.

{| class="wikitable" style="text-align: right;"
! rowspan="2" |
! colspan="3" | Fortis context
! colspan="3" | Lenis context
|- style="font-size: x-small;"
! Word !! Phonetic !! Gloss !! Word !! Phonetic !! Gloss
|-
| style="background-color: lightGrey;" colspan="7" |
|-
! before 
|  ||  || 'you make it boil'
|  ||  || 'it comes to a boil'
|-
| style="background-color: lightGrey;" colspan="7" |
|-
! before 
|  ||  || 'he's sleeping'
|  ||  || 'he's pretending to be asleep'
|}

An underlying palatal  can be determined by alternations which differ from the velar alternations. However,  has two different alternation patterns which have led to the positing of two distinct phonemes. Incidentally, the two different phonemes are also connected to two different reconstructed consonants in Proto-Athabascan. It is often symbolized as a palatalized (or front velar) fricative  (in Americanist phonetic notation) and is a reflex of Proto-Athabascan . It may be considered coronal because of its coronal voiceless allophone.

{| class="wikitable" style="text-align: right;"
! rowspan="2" |
! colspan="3" | Fortis context
! colspan="3" | Lenis context
|- style="font-size: x-small;"
! Word !! Phonetic !! Gloss !! Word !! Phonetic !! Gloss
|-
! before 
|  ||  || 'song'
|  ||  || 'her song'
|-
| style="background-color: lightGrey;" colspan="7" |
|-
! before 
|  ||  || 'I'm wise'
|  ||  || 'she's wise'
|-
| style="background-color: lightGrey;" colspan="7" |
|-
! before 
|  ||  || 'I drive them out'
|  ||  || 'she drives them out'
|}

Since the fortis reflex of this phoneme is  there is also a neutralization between this  phoneme and the alveolar  phoneme. The alveolar phoneme has a  alternation in fortis-lenis contexts:

{| class="wikitable" style="text-align: right;"
! colspan="3" | Fortis context
! colspan="3" | Lenis context
|- style="font-size: x-small;"
! Word !! Phonetic !! Gloss !! Word !! Phonetic !! Gloss
|-
|  ||  || 'sand'
|  ||  || 'her sand'
|}

Thus, the different alternations also distinguish between underlying  and underlying .

The other underlying (or morphophonemic) palatal  is considered a sonorant and has an invariant  realization in both fortis (voiceless) and lenis (voiced) contexts. This phoneme is relatively rare, occurring in only a few morphemes. It is a reflex of Proto-Athabascan  (as symbolized in Americanist notation). Two examples are below:

{| class="wikitable" style="text-align: right;"
! rowspan="2" |
! colspan="3" | Fortis context
! colspan="3" | Lenis context
|- style="font-size: x-small;"
! Word !! Phonetic !! Gloss !! Word !! Phonetic !! Gloss
|-
! before 
|  ||  || 'louse'
|  ||  || 'my louse'
|-
| style="background-color: lightGrey;" colspan="7" |
|-
! before 
|  ||  || 'I'm energetic'
|  ||  || 'you're energetic'
|}

A further distinction between the different phonemes are found in the context of d-effect.

The varying contextual realizations of these three underlying segments are summarized in the following table:

{| class="wikitable" style="text-align: center;"
! rowspan="2" | Underlying segment
! colspan="3" | Lenis
! rowspan="2" | Fortis
! rowspan="2" | D-effect
|-
! before  || before  || before 
|-
! 
|  ||  ||  ||  || 
|-
! style="line-height: 1em;" | < Proto-Ath. 
|  ||  ||  ||  || 
|-
! style="line-height: 1em;" | < Proto-Ath. 
|  ||  ||  ||  || 
|}

Voicing assimilation
The voiced continuants  at the beginning of stems vary with their voiceless counterparts , respectively. The voiceless variants occur when preceded by voiceless consonants, such as  while the voiced variants occur between voiced sounds (typically intervocalically). For example, the verb stems meaning 'spit it out', 'be burning', 'spit', and 'be ticklish' have the following forms with alternating voiced and voiceless stem-initial consonants:

{| class="wikitable"
! Phonetic forms !! Orthographic forms !! Gloss
|-
|  ||  ~  || 'spit it out'
|-
|  ||  ~  || 'be burning'
|-
|  ||  ~  || 'spit'
|-
|  ||  ~  || 'be ticklish'
|}

Since the voicing is predictable, it can be represented more abstractly as an underlying consonant that is underspecified with respect to voicing. These archiphonemes can be indicated with the capital letters . The variant voicing of the stem-initial consonant can be found in the context of subject person prefixes which are added to the verb stem:

{| class="wikitable" style="text-align: right;"
! Phonetic form !! Orthographic form !! Underlying segments !! Gloss
|-
|  ||  ||  || 'he spits it out'
|-
|  ||  ||  || 'I spit it out'
|-
|  ||  ||  || 'you two spit it out'
|-
! style='background-color: lightGrey;' colspan='4' |
|-
|  ||  ||  || 'he's burning'
|-
|  ||  ||  || 'I'm burning'
|-
|  ||  ||  || 'you two are burning'
|-
! style='background-color: lightGrey;' colspan='4' |
|-
|  ||  ||  || 'he spits'
|-
|  ||  ||  || 'I spit'
|-
|  ||  ||  || 'you two spit'
|-
! style='background-color: lightGrey;' colspan='4' |
|-
|  ||  ||  || 'he's ticklish'
|-
|  ||  ||  || 'I'm ticklish'
|-
|  ||  ||  || 'you two are ticklish'
|}

As the above examples show, the stem-initial consonant is voiced when intervocalic and voiceless when it is preceded by a voiceless   first person singular subject prefix or a voiceless  in the   two person dual subject prefix.

Another example of contextual voicing of verb-stem-initial consonants occurs when a voiceless   classifier prefix occurs before the stem as in the following:

{| class="wikitable" style="text-align: right;"
! Phonetic form !! Orthographic form !! Underlying segments !! Gloss
|-
|  ||  ||  || 'we two dribble it along'
|-
|  ||  ||  || 'he dribbles it along'
|-
|  ||  ||  || 'I dribble it along'
|-
|  ||  ||  || 'you two dribble it along'
|}

In the verb-form   ('we two dribble it along'), the  occurs between a voiced  and the voiced stem vowel . Thus it is realized as a voiced . Here the  classifier is voiced due to the d-effect of the preceding  first person dual subject prefix. In the surface verb-forms, the underlying  classifier is not pronounced due to a phonotactic restriction on consonant clusters.

The initial consonant of noun stems also display contextual voicing:
{| class="wikitable" style="text-align: right;"
! Phonetic form !! Orthographic form !! Underlying segments !! Gloss
|-
|  ||  ||  || 'language'
|-
|  ||  ||  || 'his language'
|-
! style='background-color: lightGrey;' colspan='4' |
|-
|  ||  ||  || 'smoke'
|-
|  ||  ||  || 'his smoke'
|-
! style='background-color: lightGrey;' colspan='4' |
|-
|  ||  ||  || 'callous'
|-
|  ||  ||  || "his callous"
|-
! style="background-color: lightGrey;" colspan="4" |
|-
|  ||  ||  || "cactus"
|-
|  ||  ||  || "his cactus"
|}

In this context, the stem-initial consonant is voiced. When these nouns lack a prefix (in which case the stem-initial consonant is word-initial), the realization is voiceless.

However, in some noun stems, the stem-initial continuant does not voice when intervocalic:   ('salt').

Dorsal place assimilation

Additionally, they are labialized before the rounded back vowel . This likewise happens with the velar frication of the aspirated .

{| class="wikitable" style="text-align: center;"
! rowspan="2" | Phoneme
! colspan="3" | Allophones
|-
! Palatal || Velar || Labial
|-
! 
|  ||  || 
|-
! 
|  ||  || 
|-
! 
|  ||  || 
|-
! 
|  ||  || 
|-
! 
|  ||  || 
|-
! 
|  ||  || 
|}

Coronal harmony

Navajo has coronal sibilant consonant harmony. Alveolar sibilants in prefixes assimilate to post-alveolar sibilants in stems, and post-alveolar prefixal sibilants assimilate to alveolar stem sibilants. For example, the si- stative perfective is realized as si- or shi- depending upon whether the stem contains a post-alveolar sibilant.

D-effect
A particular type of morphophonemic alternation (or mutation) occurring in Athabascan languages called d-effect is found in Navajo. The alternation in most cases is a fortition (or strengthening) process. The underlying  of these prefixes is absorbed into the following stem. D-effect can be viewed prosodically as the result of a phonotactic constraint on consonant clusters that would otherwise result from the concatenation of underlying segments. There is thus an interaction between a requirement for the grammatical information to be expressed in the surface form and an avoidance of having sequences of consonants (see the syllable section for more on phonotactics).

The fortition is typically a change from continuant to affricate or continuant to stop (i.e. adding a period of closure to the articulation). However, other changes involve glottalization of the initial consonant:

{| class="wikitable" style="text-align: center;"
! Prefix consonant + Stem-initial consonant !!  !! Surface consonant !! Example
|-
|  || → || 
| style='text-align: left;' |  →   ('he woke up')
|-
|  || → || 
| style='text-align: left;' |  →   ('you repaired it')
|-
|  || → || 
| style='text-align: left;' |  →   ('you spit on yourself')
|-
|  || → || 
| style='text-align: left;' |  →   ('we two are driving them along') (cf.   'he's driving them along')
|-
|  || → || 
| style='text-align: left;' |  →   ('we two are ticklish') (cf.  ) 'he's ticklish')
|-
|  || → || 
| style='text-align: left;' |  →   ('I'm hidden')
|-
|  || → || 
| style='text-align: left;' |  →   ('we two are rolling along') (cf.   'he's rolling along')
|-
|  || → || 
| style='text-align: left;' |  →   ('she said again')
|-
|  || → || 
| style='text-align: left;' |  →   ('we two are energetic') (cf.   'I'm energetic')
|}

Often different underlying consonants are posited to explain the different alternation. (See the velar /ɣ/, palatal /j/ section for further explanation.)

Another example of d-effect influences not the stem-initial consonant but the classifier prefix.

{| class="wikitable" style="text-align: center;"
! Prefix consonant + Classifier consonant !! !! Surface consonant !! Example
|-
|  || → || 
| style="text-align: left;" |  →   ('we two tame it')
|}

Other
 n > high tone
 expressive x clusters

Vowels

Navajo has four contrastive vowel qualities  at three different vowel heights (high, mid, low) and a front-back contrast between the mid vowels . There are also two contrastive vowel lengths and a contrast in nasalization. This results in 16 phonemic vowels, shown below.

{| class="wikitable" style="text-align: center;"
|+ Oral, Long
!
! Front
! Back
|-
! High
|  ||
|-
! Mid
|  || 
|-
! Low
| || 
|}

{| class="wikitable" style="text-align: center;"
|+ Nasal, Long
!
! Front
! Back
|-
! High
|  ||
|-
! Mid
|  || 
|-
! Low
| || 
|}

This phonetic difference is salient to native speakers, who will consider a short vowel at a higher position to be a mispronunciation. Similarly, short  is pronounced . Short  is a bit more variable and more centralized, covering the space . Notably, the variation in  does not approach , which is a true gap in the vowel space.

Although the nasalization is contrastive in the surface phonology, many instances of nasalized vowels can be derived from a sequence of Vowel + Nasal consonant in a more abstract analysis. Additionally, there are alternations between long and short vowels that are predictable.

Acoustic phonetics

 has acoustic measurements of the formants of Navajo long and short vowel pairs as pronounced by 10 female and 4 male native speakers. Below are the median values of the first (F1) and second (F2) formants for this study.

{| class="wikitable" style="text-align: center;"
|+ Oral Vowels from 
! Vowel !! F1 !! F2
| rowspan="5" |
! Vowel !! F1 !! F2
|-
! 
| 372 || 2532
! 
| 513 || 957
|-
! 
| 463 || 2057
! 
| 537 || 1154
|-
! 
| 487 || 2195
! 
| 752 || 1309
|-
! 
| 633 || 1882
! 
| 696 || 1454
|}

An earlier study has measurements from seven female speakers:

{| class="wikitable" style="text-align: center;"
|+ Oral Vowels from 
! Vowel !! F1 !! F2
| rowspan="5" |
! Vowel !! F1 !! F2
|-
! 
| 315 || 2528
! 
| 488 || 943
|-
! 
| 391 || 2069
! 
| 558 || 1176
|-
! 
| 498 || 2200
! 
| 802 || 1279
|-
! 
| 619 || 2017
! 
| 808 || 1299
|}

Tones
Navajo has two tones: high and low. Orthographically, high tone is marked with an acute accent  over the affected vowel, while low tone is left unmarked  This reflects the tonal polarity of Navajo, as syllables have low tone by default.

Long vowels normally have level tones .

The sonorant  also carries tone when it is syllabic. Here again, the high tone is marked with an acute  while the low tone is left unmarked .

Even though low tone is the default, these syllables are not underspecified for tone: they have a distinct phonetic tone, and their pitch is not merely a function of their environment. This contrasts with the related Carrier language. As in many languages, however, the pitches at the beginnings of Navajo vowels are lower after voiced consonants than after tenuis and aspirated consonants. After ejective consonants, only high tones are lowered, so that the distinction between high and low tone is reduced. However, the type of consonant has little effect on the pitch in the middle of the vowel, so that vowels have characteristic rising pitches after voiced consonants.

The pitch of a vowel is also affected by the tone of the previous syllable: in most cases, this has as great an effect on the pitch of a syllable as its own tone. However, this effect is effectively blocked by an intervening aspirated consonant.

Tonological processes
Navajo nouns are simple:   kǫ́ ('fire'),   bidił ('his blood'). Most long nouns are actually deverbal.

In verbs, with few exceptions, only stems may carry a high tone: C V(ː)(C)(T). Prefixes are mostly single consonants, C-, and do not carry tone. The one exception is the high-tone vocalic prefix . Most other tone-bearing units in the Navajo verb are second stems or clitics.

All Navajo verbs can be analyzed as compounds, and this greatly simplifies the description of tone. There are two obligatory components, the "I" stem (for "inflection") and the "V" stem (for "verb"), each potentially bearing a high tone, and each preceded by its own prefixes. In addition, the compound as a whole takes 'agreement' prefixes like the prefixes found on nouns. This entire word may then take proclitics, which may also carry tone:

{| class="wikitable" border="1"
! clitics=
| agreement– || (prefixes–
! I-stem)
|  + || (prefixes–
! V-stem)
|-
| tone || colspan="2" | || tone || colspan="2" | || tone
|}

(Hyphens "–" mark prefixes, double hyphens "=" mark clitics, and plus signs "+" join compounds.)

Any high tones on clitics spread to the next syllable of the word only if it is short and located immediately before the verbal stem. This can be seen with the iterative clitic . Compare

ha=ni-sh+ł-chaad
hanishchaad
'I card it (wool)'

and
ha=ná=ni-sh+ł-chaʼ
hanáníshchaʼ
'I usually card it (wool)'
where the clitic ná= creates a high tone on the following short pre-stem syllable in bold, but,
ha=ná=ni-iid+ł-chaʼ
hanániichaʼ
'we usually card it (wool)'

and

ha=ná=da=ni-oh+ł-chaʼ
hanídanołchaʼ
'you (pl) usually card it (wool)'

where it does not.

 conjunct prefixes in verb stems are unmarked for tone (with a few exceptions) – they assimilate to the tones of neighboring prefixes
 tones in disjunct prefixes and stems are underlying specified
 certain enclitics (like the subordinator ) affect the tones of preceding verb stems

Syllable

Stems. The stems (e.g. noun stems, verb stems, etc.) have the following syllable types:

 

That is, all syllables must have a consonant onset C, a vowel nucleus V. The syllable may carry a high tone T, the vowel nucleus may be short or long, and there may optionally be a consonant coda.

Prefixes. Prefixes typically have a syllable structure of CV-, such as chʼí- ('out horizontally'). Exceptions to this are certain verbal prefixes, such as the classifiers (-ł-, -l-, -d-) that occur directly before the verb stem, which consist of a single consonant -C-. A few other verbal prefixes, such as naa- ('around') on the outer left edge of the verb have long vowels, CVV-. A few prefixes have more complex syllable shapes, such as hashtʼe- ('ready') (CVCCV-). Prefixes do not carry tone.

Some analyses, such as that of Harry Hoijer, consider conjunct verbal prefixes to have the syllable shape CV-. In other generative analyses, the same prefixes are considered to have only underlying consonants of the shape C-. Then, in certain environments, an epenthetic vowel (the default vowel is ) is inserted after the consonantal prefix.

Peg elements, segment insertion

All verbs must be at least disyllabic. Some verbs may only have a single overt nonsyllabic consonantal prefix or a prefix lacking an onset, or no prefix at all before the verb stem. Since all verbs are required to have two syllables, a meaningless prefix must be added to the verb to fulfill the disyllabic requirement. This prosodic prefix is known as a peg element in Athabascan terminology (Edward Sapir used the term pepet vowel). For example, the verb meaning "she/he/they is/are crying" has the following morphological composition: Ø-Ø-cha where both the imperfective modal prefix and the third person subject prefix are phonologically null morphemes and the verb stem is -cha. In order for this verb to be complete a yi- peg element must be prefixed to the verb stem, resulting in the verb form yicha. Another examples are verb yishcha ('I'm crying') which is morphologically Ø-sh-cha (Ø- null imperfective modal, -sh- first person singular subject, -cha verb stem) and wohcha ('you [2+] are crying') which is Ø-oh-cha (Ø- null imperfective modal, -oh- second person dual-plural subject, -cha verb stem). The glide consonant of the peg element is  before ,  before , and  before .

Notes

Bibliography
 
 
 
 
 
 
 
 
 
 
 
 {{citation
|last1=Young
|first1=Robert W.
|last2=Morgan
|first2=William, Sr.
|year=1987
|title=The Navajo language: A grammar and colloquial dictionary (rev. ed.).
|place=Albuquerque
|publisher=University of New Mexico Press
|isbn=0-8263-1014-1
}}

Further reading
 Cook, Eung-Do; & Rice, Keren. (1989). Introduction. In E.-D. Cook & K. Rice (Eds.), Athapaskan linguistics: Current perspectives on a language family (pp. 1–61). Berlin: Mouton de Gruyter.
 Haile, Berard. (1941–1948). Learning Navaho, (Vols. 1–4). St. Michaels, AZ: St. Michael's Mission.
 Hale, Kenneth. (1970–1972). Navajo linguistics (Nos. 1–4). (Unpublished manuscript). (Available online: www.swarthmore.edu/SocSci/tfernal1/nla/halearch/halearch.htm).
 Hardy, Frank W. (1979). Navajo aspectual verb stem variation. (Doctoral dissertation, University of New Mexico).
 Harris, Zellig S. (1945). Navaho phonology and Hoijer's analysis. International Journal of American Linguistics, 11 (4), 239–46
 Hoijer, Harry. (1938). The southern Athapaskan languages. American Anthropologist, 40 (1), 75–87.
 Hoijer, Harry. (1943). Pitch accent in the Apachean languages. Language, 19 (1), 38–41.
 Hoijer, Harry. (1945b). Review of The Story of the Navajo Hail Chant by Gladys A. Reichard. International Journal of American Linguistics, 11 (2), 123–25.
 Hoijer, Harry. (1953). Review of Navaho Grammar by Gladys A. Reichard. International Journal of American Linguistics, 19 (1), 78–83.
 Hoijer, Harry. (1970). A Navajo lexicon. University of California Publications in Linguistics (No. 78). Berkeley: University of California Press.
 Kari, James. (1975). The disjunct boundary in the Navajo and Tanaina verb prefix complexes. International Journal of American Linguistics, 41, 330–45.
 Kari, James. (1976). Navajo verb prefix phonology. Garland Publishing Co.
 Krauss, Michael E. (1970). Review of The Phonology and Morphology of the Navaho Language by Edward Sapir & Harry Hoijer. International Journal of American Linguistics, 36 (3), 220–28.
 Krauss, Michael E.; & Leer, Jeff. (1981). Athabaskan, Eyak, and Tlingit sonorants. Alaska Native Language Center research papers (No. 5). Fairbanks, AK: University of Alaska, Alaska Native Language Center.
 Ladefoged, Peter; & Maddieson, Ian. (1996). The sounds of the world’s languages. Oxford: Blackwell.
 Leer, Jeff. (1979). Proto-Athabaskan verb stem variation I: Phonology. Alaska Native Language Center research papers (No. 1). Fairbanks, AK: Alaska Native Language Center.
 McDonough, Joyce. (1990). Topics in the morphology and phonology of Navajo verbs. (Doctoral dissertation, University of Massachusetts Amherst).
 McDonough, Joyce. (1996). Epenthesis in Navajo. In E. Jelinek, S. Midgette, L. Saxon, & K. Rice (Eds.), Athabaskan language studies: Essays in honor of Robert W. Young (pp. 235–57). Albuquerque: University of New Mexico Press.
 McDonough, Joyce. (1999). Tone in Navajo. Anthropological Linguistics, 41 (4), 503–39.
 McDonough, Joyce; & Austin-Garrison, M. (1995). Vowel enhancement and dispersion in the Navajo vowel space. University of California Working Papers in Phonetics, 87, 105–13.
 McDonough, Joyce; & Ladefoged, Peter. (1996). The specification of stop contrasts in Navajo. In M. Nespor & I. Vogel (Eds.), Dam phonology: HIL phonology papers II (pp. 123–42). Holland Institute of Linguistics Publications.
 Platero, Paul R. (1986). Diné bizaad bee naadzo: A conversational Navajo text for secondary schools, colleges and adults. Farmington, NM: Navajo Preparatory School.
 Platero, Paul R.; Legah, Lorene; & Platero, Linda S. (1985). Diné bizaad bee naʼadzo: A Navajo language literacy and grammar text. Farmington, NM: Navajo Language Institute.
 Reichard, Gladys A. (1947). Reply to Hoijer's review of The story of the Navajo hail chant. International Journal of American Linguistics, 13 (3), 193–96.
 Reichard, Gladys A. (1948). Significance of aspiration in Navaho. International Journal of American Linguistics, 14 (1), 15–19.
 Reichard, Gladys A. (1951). Navaho grammar. Publications of the American Ethnological Society (Vol. 21). New York: J. J. Augustin.
 Rice, Keren. (1997). A reexamination of Proto-Athabaskan *y. Anthropological Linguistics, 39 (3), 423–36.
 Sapir, Edward, & Hoijer, Harry. (1942). Navaho texts. William Dwight Whitney series, Linguistic Society of America.
 Saville, Muriel. (1968). Navajo morphophonemics. (Doctoral dissertation, University of Texas).
 Stanley, Richard. (1969). The phonology of the Navajo verb. (Doctoral dissertation, MIT).
 Witherspoon, Gary. (1985). Diné Bizaad Bóhooʼaah for secondary schools, colleges, and adults. Farmington, NM: Navajo Language Institute.
 Witherspoon, Gary. (1986). Diné Bizaad Bóhooʼaah I: A conversational Navajo text for secondary schools, colleges and adults''. Farmington, NM: Navajo Language Institute.

Phonology
Native American phonologies